Calamity Anne, Heroine is a 1913 American short silent Western film directed by Lorimer Johnston starring Louise Lester as Calamity Anne. It is the fourth film in the Calamity Anne series.

Other cast
 Charlotte Burton
 J. Warren Kerrigan
 Jack Richardson
 Helen Armstrong
 Violet Neitz
 Charles Morrison
 George Periolat

External links
 

1913 films
1913 Western (genre) films
American silent short films
American black-and-white films
Heroine
Silent American Western (genre) films
Films directed by Lorimer Johnston
1910s American films